The 2012 Women's Youth World Handball Championship was the 4th edition of the tournament and took place in the Montenegro from 16 to 26 August 2012.

Denmark won the final against Russia by 27–26.

Preliminary round
The draw was held on 23 May 2012 in Basel, Switzerland. The match schedule was released on 10 July.

All times are local (UTC+2)

Group A

Group B

Group C

Group D

Knockout stage

Championship

Quarterfinals

Semifinals

Third place game

Final

5–8th place playoffs

Semifinals

Seventh place game

Fifth place game

9–12th place playoffs

Semifinals

Eleventh place game

Ninth place game

13–16th place playoffs

Semifinals

15th place game

13th place game

17–20th place playoffs

Semifinals

19th place game

17th place game

Final standings

Awards
MVP

Topscorer
 (62 goals)

All-star team
Goalkeeper: 
Right wing: 
Right back: 
Central back: 
Left back: 
Left wing: 
Pivot:

References

External links

IHF Website

International handball competitions hosted by Montenegro
Women's Youth World Handball Championship
Women's Youth World Handball Championship
2012
Women's handball in Montenegro
Youth World Handball Championship